Nassau Street is a  street in Winnipeg, Manitoba, located partially within the Osborne Village and Fort Rouge neighbourhoods.

The north terminus of Nassau St. North is Roslyn Crescent and travels in a southeast direction, crossing Pembina Highway, swinging southwest before joining up with Garwood Avenue. Its route length is 

The north terminus of Nassau St. South is Brandon Avenue and travels in a southeast direction ending near Churchill Drive with a break near Kylemore Avenue.

Notable locations 
55 Nassau, a 38-floor condominium in the Fort Rouge area, is currently the 5th-tallest building in Winnipeg and the tallest residential building in the city (until the completion of the Artis Reit Residential Tower on 300 Main Street).

738 Nassau is a multifamily housing complex designed by Manitoba architect Gustavo da Roza.

Also on this road are the Nassau Street Church (formerly Gospel Mennonite Church; 232 Nassau) and St. Luke’s Anglican Church (130 Nassau), which became a municipally-designated historic building in 2018.

References 

Streets and squares in Winnipeg
Fort Rouge, Winnipeg